Alexander Porfyrovych Archipenko (also referred to as Olexandr, Oleksandr, or Aleksandr; , Romanized: Olexandr Porfyrovych Arkhypenko; February 25, 1964) was a Ukrainian-American avant-garde artist, sculptor, and graphic artist, active in France and the United States. He was one of the first to apply the principles of Cubism to architecture, analyzing human figure into geometrical forms.

Biography

Alexander Archipenko was born in Kyiv (Russian Empire, now Ukraine) in 1887, to Porfiry Antonowych Archipenko and Poroskowia Vassylivna Machowa Archipenko; he was the younger brother of Eugene Archipenko.

From 1902 to 1905 he attended the Kyiv Art School (KKhU). In 1906 he continued his education in the arts at Serhiy Svetoslavsky (Kyiv), and later that year had an exhibition there with Alexander Bogomazov. He then moved to Moscow where he had a chance to exhibit his work in some group shows.

Archipenko moved to Paris in 1908 and quickly enrolled in the École des Beaux-Arts, which he left after a few weeks. He was a resident in the artist's colony La Ruche, among émigré Ukrainian artists: Wladimir Baranoff-Rossine, Sonia Delaunay-Terk and Nathan Altman. After 1910 he had exhibitions at Salon des Indépendants, Salon d'Automne together with Aleksandra Ekster, Kazimir Malevich, Vadym Meller, Sonia Delaunay-Terk, Georges Braque, André Derain and others.

In 1912 Archipenko had his first personal exhibition at the Museum Folkwang at Hagen in Germany, and from 1912 to 1914 he was teaching at his own Art School in Paris.

Four of Archipenko's Cubist sculptures, including Family Life and five of his drawings, appeared in the controversial Armory Show in 1913 in New York City. These works were caricatured in the New York World.

Archipenko moved to Nice in 1914. In 1920 he participated in Twelfth Biennale Internazionale dell'Arte di Venezia in Italy and started his own Art school in Berlin the following year. In 1922 Archipenko participated in the First Russian Art Exhibition in the Gallery van Diemen in Berlin together with Aleksandra Ekster, Kazimir Malevich, Solomon Nikritin, El Lissitzky and others.

In 1923 he emigrated to the United States. He became a US citizen in 1929. In 1933 he exhibited at the Ukrainian pavilion in Chicago as part of the Century of Progress World's Fair. Alexander Archipenko contributed the most to the success of the Ukrainian pavilion. His works occupied one room and were valued at $25,000 dollars.

In 1936 Archipenko participated in an exhibition Cubism and Abstract Art in New York as well as numerous exhibitions in Europe and other places in the U.S. He was elected to the American Academy of Arts and Letters in 1962.

Alexander Archipenko died on February 25, 1964, in New York City. He is interred at Woodlawn Cemetery in The Bronx, New York City.

Contribution to art 

Archipenko, along with the French-Hungarian sculptor Joseph Csaky, exhibited at the first public manifestations of Cubism in Paris; the Salon des Indépendants and Salon d'Automne, 1910 and 1911, being the first, after Picasso, to employ the Cubist style in three dimensions. Archipenko departed from the neo-classical sculpture of his time, using faceted planes and negative space to create a new way of looking at the human figure, showing a number of views of the subject simultaneously. He is known for introducing sculptural voids, and for his inventive mixing of genres throughout his career: devising 'sculpto-paintings', and later experimenting with materials such as clear acrylic and terra cotta. Inspired by the works of Picasso and Braque, he is also credited for introducing the collage to wider audiences with his Medrano series.

The sculptor Ann Weaver Norton apprenticed with Archipenko for a number of years.

Public collections 
Among the public collections holding works by Alexander Archipenko are:
 The Addison Gallery of American Art (Andover, Massachusetts)
 The Art Institute of Chicago
 The Mary and Leigh Block Museum of Art (Northwestern University, Illinois)
 Brigham Young University Museum of Art (Utah)
 Chi-Mei Museum (Taiwan)
 The Delaware Art Museum (Wilmington, Delaware)
 The Denver Art Museum (Colorado)
 The Fine Arts Museums of San Francisco
 The Guggenheim Museum (New York City)
 The Hermitage Museum (Saint Petersburg)
 The Hirshhorn Museum and Sculpture Garden (Washington D.C.)
 The Honolulu Museum of Art
 Indiana University Art Museum (Bloomington)
 The Los Angeles County Museum of Art
 The Maier Museum of Art (Randolph-Macon Woman's College, Virginia)
 The Milwaukee Art Museum
 The Minneapolis Institute of Art (Minneapolis)
 The Montgomery Museum of Fine Arts (Alabama)
 The Museum of Fine Arts, Boston
 The Museum of Fine Arts, Houston
 The Museum of Modern Art (New York City)
 The National Museum of Serbia (Belgrade, Serbia)
 The Nasher Sculpture Center (Dallas, Texas)
 The National Gallery of Art (Washington D.C.)
 National Museum Cardiff
 The North Carolina Museum of Art
 The Norton Simon Museum (Pasadena, California)
 The Peggy Guggenheim Collection (Venice)
 The Philadelphia Museum of Art (Pennsylvania)
 The Phillips Collection (Washington D.C.)
 The Portland Art Museum (Portland, Oregon)
 The Portland Museum of Art (Maine)
 Salisbury House (Des Moines, Iowa)
 The San Antonio Art League Museum (Texas)
 The San Diego Museum of Art (California)
 The Sheldon Memorial Art Gallery (Lincoln, Nebraska)
 The Smithsonian American Art Museum (Washington D.C.)
 Städel Museum (Frankfurt)
 Tate Modern (London)
 The Tel Aviv Museum of Art (Israel)
 The Ukrainian Museum (New York City)
 Von der Heydt-Museum (Wuppertal, Germany)
 Walker Art Center (Minnesota)
 The Cleveland Cultural Gardens (Ukrainian Garden) in Rockefeller Park (Ohio)
 Fundación D.O.P. (Caracas)
 Museum de Fundatie (Zwolle, Netherlands)

Archipenko began work on a smaller prototype of the statue in 1964, but died before the work was finished, leaving his wife to oversee its completion. The full-sized statue was completed in 1968 and was donated to the university in 1985.

Gallery

Further reading

Notes

External links

 The Archipenko Foundation
 
 
 Artcyclopedia page with links to images
 "Refashioning the Figure – The Sketchbooks of Archipenko c.1920", by Marek Bartelik (Henry Moore Institute Essays on Sculpture No. 41)
 Archipenko. Catalogue of Exhibition and Description of Archipentura. New York, The Anderson Galleries, 1928.
 Katharine Kuh. Alexander Archipenko. A Memorial Exhibition 1967-1969. The UCLA Art Galleries, 1969.
 Nagy Ildiko, Archipenko Album, 1980
 

1887 births
1964 deaths
Artists from Kyiv
Ukrainian male sculptors
Ukrainian sculptors
Emigrants from the Russian Empire to the United States
American people of Ukrainian descent
American male sculptors
20th-century American sculptors
20th-century Ukrainian male artists
Modern sculptors
 01
Cubist artists
Ukrainian avant-garde
National Academy of Visual Arts and Architecture alumni
Members of the American Academy of Arts and Letters
National Sculpture Society members
Burials at Woodlawn Cemetery (Bronx, New York)
20th-century American male artists